The following is a list of the 208 communes of the Rhône department of France. This list does not includes the Lyon Metropolis which is have 59 communes. For communes in the Lyon Metropolis, see Communes of the Lyon Metropolis.

The communes cooperate in the following intercommunalities (as of 2020):
Communauté d'agglomération de l'Ouest Rhodanien
Communauté d'agglomération Vienne Condrieu (partly)
Communauté d'agglomération Villefranche Beaujolais Saône (partly)
Communauté de communes Beaujolais Pierres Dorées
Communauté de communes de l'Est lyonnais
Communauté de communes des Monts du Lyonnais (partly)
Communauté de communes du Pays de L'Arbresle
Communauté de communes du Pays Mornantais
Communauté de communes du Pays de l'Ozon
Communauté de communes Saône Beaujolais
Communauté de communes de la Vallée du Garon
Communauté de communes des Vallons du Lyonnais

References

Rhone